Tongmi line of Beijing Suburban Railway (BCR), formerly known as Jingcheng line, is a commuter rail line in Beijing. It opened on 30 June 2020.

The main line runs on the existing Beijing–Chengde Railway, and the branch line runs on the existing Beijing–Tongliao Railway.

Stations

References

Railway lines in China
Rail transport in Beijing
Standard gauge railways in China
Railway lines opened in 2020